Temple Emanuel of Tempe is a Reform synagogue in Tempe, Arizona founded in 1976.

As of March 2021 there are 378 membership families.  Senior rabbi is Rabbi Cookie Lea Olshein.

References

Further reading
 The Jewish Community in Tempe - Temple Emanuel of Tempe pp 15–19.  Temple History Museum.

External links
 Official website

Reform synagogues in Arizona